Pentamerida is an order of biconvex, impunctate shelled, articulate brachiopods that are found in marine sedimentary rocks that range from the Middle Cambrian through the Devonian.

Pentamerids are characterized by a short hinge line where the two valves articulate, inner areas above the hinge line that slope inwardly from the beak of each valve, and a well-developed spondylium on the pedicle valve. The spondylium is a raised platform for muscle attachment found in the middle of the interior pedicle valve, generally toward the hinge and beak. The pedicle valve is the one that the pedicle, or hold-fast stalk, attaches to. The brachidia, which hold the lophophore, the ciliated feeding arms, are looped, as in the Orthida.

The Short hinge line helps distinguish the pentamerids from the ancestral orthids from which they are obviously derived. The hinge line is not as short as found in the Rhynchonellida or Athyridida.

In the older classification of Moore, Lalicker and Fischer, 1952, the Pentamerida was regarded as simply an order in the Class Articulata and divided into two suborders, the Syntrophiacea and the Pentameracea, presented with superfamily endings of the time.
The treatise on Invertebrate Paleontology, Part H Brachiopida (revised) now places the Order Pentamerida in the Class Rhynchonellata and divides it into the suborders Syntrophiidina and Pentameridina. The Syntrophiidina are the more primitive of the two.

References
 
The Paleobioloy Database Pentamerida entry

Prehistoric brachiopods
Prehistoric animal orders
Brachiopod orders
Cambrian first appearances
Late Devonian animals
Late Devonian extinctions
Rhynchonellata